From December 1876 to April 1877, both the Republican and Democratic parties in South Carolina claimed to be the legitimate government. Both parties declared that the other party had lost the election and that they controlled the governorship, the state legislature, and most state offices. Both governments debated and passed laws, created militias, collected taxes, and conducted other businesses as if the other government did not exist. Ultimately, after four months of having a disputed government, Daniel Henry Chamberlain, who claimed the governorship as a Republican, conceded to Democrat Wade Hampton III on April 11, 1877 after President Rutherford Hayes withdrew federal troops from the South.

Background

Prior to the Civil War and until the Great Migration in the early twentieth century, African Americans outnumbered the white population in South Carolina. According to the official U.S. Census of 1870, there were 705,606 people living in South Carolina, 465,814 (58.9%) of whom were African American. Additionally, most African Americans that cast ballots during the Reconstruction era voted Republican. However, in the mid-1870s, the Democratic party in South Carolina sought to return the state to its pre-Confederacy status by electing former Confederates to political offices and by preventing African Americans from voting through black codes, literacy tests, poll taxes, and intimidation. White Southerners referred to the emergence of these white supremacist governments as "Redeemer governments or "saviors of the South." Democrats resorted to military-style intimidation in order to overcome the white minority in the state. These quasi-militias broke up Republican rallies and attempted to instill fear into Republican voters. In 1875 and 1876, Democrats, the Ku Klux Klan, and the Red Shirts led a terrorist reign against blacks in the state, leading to President Ulysses S. Grant's decision to send federal troops into South Carolina to protect African Americans and Republicans. 

In 1876, the Democrats nominated former Confederate lieutenant general Wade Hampton III to run for governor. Hampton was born into the wealthy and prestigious Hampton family in Charleston, and his family made millions through its use of slave labor on cotton plantations. Daniel Henry Chamberlain, a Massachusetts-born lawyer, was the incumbent Republican governor of South Carolina, elected in 1874. Chamberlain was running for reelection in 1876 against Hampton. Hampton and white Democrats alike sought to eliminate "Radical Republicans" from office and establish a Democratic ticket with no opposition. On election day, vote tallies reported that Wade Hampton III won the election. Immediately, there were accusations of election fraud, and some Democrats even later admitted that Georgians crossed the border to vote, that African American voters were intentionally uncounted or prohibited from voting, and that some people voted more than once.

Results of the election of 1876
Swiftly after the results were declared, both Republicans and Democrats accused the other side of fraud. Hampton received 92,261 votes compared to Chamberlain's 91,127. However, the State Board of Canvassers, composed of five Republicans, declared that the elections in Edgefield County and Laurens County were so tainted by fraud that their results would be excluded from the final tally. This changed the Republican election result from a 1,134-vote defeat to a 3,145-vote victory. Both parties claimed the governorship, the General Assembly, and most state offices. 

Both Republicans and Democrats refused to concede that the other party had won the election. The Democrats claimed that they had received the majority of votes and were therefore the legitimate government. Republicans claimed that Democrats had committed voter fraud through the intimidation of African Americans, black codes, ballot stuffing, and by having more votes cast than registered voters. The Republican Party issued a statement: "that if the canvass in the State had been free from violence and fraud the republican majority would have been sufficient [to elect] all the candidates [from the Republican Party.]"

Dual government

Both Chamberlain and Hampton refused to yield to claims that the other was elected governor. As the incumbent governor, Chamberlain secretly ordered troops to occupy the South Carolina Statehouse on November 27 in order to prevent the Democrats from taking control. The next morning, seeing that they were unable to enter the Statehouse, Democrats instead established their government at the Choral Union Hall to avoid confrontation. The following day, Democrats marched to the Statehouse, led by former Independent Governor James L. Orr. This time, Democrats entered the chamber of the House of Representatives. Upon realizing the Democrats' entry, Republican lawmakers rushed into the chamber. William Wallace, who had been elected Speaker of the House by the Democratic legislature, and E.W.M. Mackey, who had been elected Speaker by the Republican legislature, fought over possession of the Speaker's chair. Several lawmakers, both Republican and Democrat, rushed the stage and refused to move. Neither party abandoned the chamber for four days and nights, and both sides conducted business; both legislatures debated bills, passed laws, and recognized speakers. On December 4, Chamberlain threatened to evict the Democratic legislature with military force, and the Democrats left the chamber to avoid bloodshed. 

A provision of the 1868 South Carolina constitution required that the General Assembly elect the governor in the event of a disputed election. Since the Republican General Assembly claimed to have a majority as the votes from Edgefield and Laurens counties were excluded, the body elected Chamberlain to a second term on December 6. He began the new term following day and said in his inaugural address, "I regard the present hour in South Carolina as a crisis at which no patriotic citizen should shrink from any post to which public duty may call him. ; If we fail now our Government the Government of South Carolina will no longer rest up on the consent of the governed." 

Democrats in the General Assembly, some of whom whose offices were ruled vacant because of accusations of election fraud, declared themselves a quorum. Claiming that they were the legitimate government, they elected Hampton as governor. They held an inauguration of their own  though this was located at Carolina Hall, now Longstreet Theatre, not the Statehouse. Both the Republican group and the Democratic group conducted business as if the other did not exist between December 1876 and April 1877. According to historian Ronald F. King, neither group had legitimacy, though each group continued to debate legislation and pass laws. On December 6, the South Carolina Supreme Court ruled that the Democratic legislature was the lawful government, but federal troops pledged loyalty to Chamberlain and the Republican government and continued to bar Democrats from entering the Statehouse.

Hampton made a requested to South Carolinians to refuse to pay taxes to the Chamberlain government.  To support the Hampton government, each taxpayer was asked to contribute just 10% of what his tax bill had been the previous year. South Carolinians, both white and black, paid taxes to the Hampton government and refused to pay taxes to the Chamberlain government, thereby denying the Chamberlain government its last legitimacy and authority apart from the U.S. Army.

Tensions further rose when it was declared that Rutherford B. Hayes, a Republican, had won the Presidential election of 1876 in South Carolina, but that Hampton, a Democrat, had won the gubernatorial race. Hampton continued to appoint judges, commission militia units, and deliver executive orders. On December 20, Governor Chamberlain issued a pardon for Peter Smith in the state penitentiary, but the state Supreme Court ruled that the pardon was invalid because Chamberlain was not the legitimate governor. Contrarily, on February 9, 1877, Governor Hampton pardoned Tilda Norris, but the superintendent of the state penitentiary refuses to release her as he did not recognize Hampton as governor. However, the state Supreme Court sided with Hampton and forced the release of Tilda Norris.

Federal involvement
In December 1876, Senator John Brown Gordon of Georgia proposed a resolution in the US Senate to declare Wade Hampton III as the lawful governor of South Carolina. However, in January 1877, Senator John J. Patterson, a South Carolina Republican, replied to the resolution of Senator Gordon by submitting papers that Governor Chamberlain was the legally elected governor.

Meeting with President Hayes

On March 31, 1877, Chamberlain and Hampton went to Washington, D.C. to meet with the newly elected Republican president, Rutherford Hayes. Both men presented their cases to be governor. Hayes had himself narrowly won his  election by one electoral vote, and was accused of electoral fraud. Once elected, and as part of the Compromise of 1877, Hayes adopted a "hands-off" policy toward the South. Hayes did not agree that use of federal troops in deciding a local election was justified. Hayes told the two governors that he had intentions of withdrawing federal troops from the South, an action which came to fruition on April 3. Lacking support, Chamberlain and the Republican government struggled to exercise power and were at a greater disadvantage than Hampton and the Democratic government. With the introduction of black codes and other forms of voter restrictions for African Americans, the Republicans quickly lost electoral support.

Chamberlain's concession
By April 10, federal troops had left the Statehouse. Knowing that he would not have the capacity to carry on as governor without the support of the federal troops, Chamberlain abdicated his duties on April 11. After conceding the governor's office to Hampton, Chamberlain remarked, "If a majority of people in a State are unable by physical force to maintain their rights, they must be left to political servitude." Hampton was declared the sole governor of South Carolina upon Chamberlain's concession, and Chamberlain fled the state and resumed his law career. Hampton won reelection in 1878, but he resigned in February 1879 to succeed Republican John J. Patterson as a United States Senator from South Carolina. Another Republican governor was not elected in South Carolina until 1974, nearly 100 years later, and the Democratic party controlled the General Assembly until the 1990s. The Democratic Party did not face any serious opposition in most gubernatorial elections until the 1970s, often running unopposed.

Notes

See also
History of South Carolina
1876 South Carolina gubernatorial election
1876 United States presidential election
African Americans in South Carolina
Compromise of 1877
List of governors of South Carolina

References

History of South Carolina